Makwale is an administrative ward in the Kyela district of the Mbeya Region of Tanzania. In 2016 the Tanzania National Bureau of Statistics report there were 13,946 people in the ward, from 12,654 in 2012.

Villages / vitongoji 
The ward has 7 villages and 27 vitongoji.

 Ibale
 Ibale
 Kichangani
 Maendeleo
 Tumaini
 Kateela
 Kateela
 Mbugujo
 Mwalisi
 Mwambungula
 Mahenge
 Ilopa
 Isabula
 Mahenge
 Makwale
 Isimba
 Makwale A
 Makwale B
 Mwalisi
 Mpegele
 Katago
 Mchangani
 Mpegele
 Mpunguti
 Bulyambwa
 Katete
 Mahanji
 Mpunguti
 Ngeleka
 Iponjola
 Katago
 Lukuju
 Mwalingo
 Ngeleka I

References 

Wards of Mbeya Region